The Queen Mother Memorial Cup is a Group 3 Thoroughbred handicap horse race in Hong Kong, run at Sha Tin over 2400 metres in June. 

Horses rated 80 and above which have not won a Group 1 or Hong Kong Group 1 race in the season are qualified to enter the race.

Winners

See also
 List of Hong Kong horse races

References 
Racing Post:
 , 

 Racing Information of Queen Mother Memorial Cup (2011/12)
 The Hong Kong Jockey Club 

Horse races in Hong Kong